Pristimantis chalceus is a species of frog in the family Strabomantidae.
It is found in Colombia and Ecuador.
Its natural habitats are tropical moist lowland forests, moist montane forests, rivers, and heavily degraded former forest.
It is threatened by habitat loss.

References

chalceus
Amphibians of Colombia
Amphibians of Ecuador
Amphibians described in 1873
Taxa named by Wilhelm Peters
Taxonomy articles created by Polbot